Caleb Marchbank (born 7 December 1996) is a professional Australian rules footballer playing for the Carlton Football Club in the Australian Football League (AFL). He was recruited by Greater Western Sydney with their second selection and sixth overall in the 2014 national draft. He made his debut in the fifty-six point loss against  at Spotless Stadium in round 12, 2015. In September 2016, Marchbank requested a trade from Greater Western Sydney and nominated  as his preferred club. He was officially traded to Carlton in October.

Marchbank was named the 2017 AFL Rising Star nominee for round 6 after gaining 21 disposals and taking 10 marks in the Blues' 19-point win over the Sydney Swans at the Melbourne Cricket Ground.

In 2019, Marchbank played 13 games, averaging nearly five marks and six intercept possessions a game. However his career then stalled due to injuries: he suffered a neck injury against Melbourne in Round 16, which ruled him out for the rest of the season; then missed the next two seasons with knee injuries, including a ruptured ACL in 2021. He finally made his senior return in Round 13, 2022; and, after suffering another injury in that return game, eventually played four senior matches for the year.

Statistics
 Statistics are correct to the end of round 17, 2019.

|- style="background-color: #EAEAEA"
| scope="row" style="text-align:center" | 2015
|
| 34 || 5 || 0 || 0 || 23 || 20 || 43 || 17 || 6 || 0.0 || 0.0 || 4.6 || 4.0 || 8.6 || 3.4 || 1.2
|-
| scope="row" text-align:center | 2016
|
| 34 || 2 || 0 || 1 || 12 || 9 || 21 || 5 || 5 || 0.0 || 0.5 || 6.0 || 4.5 || 10.5 || 2.5 || 2.5
|- style="background-color: #EAEAEA"
| scope="row" style="text-align:center" | 2017
|
| 22 || 16 || 0 || 1 || 184 || 64 || 248 || 102	|| 40 || 0.0 || 0.1 || 11.5 || 4.0 || 15.5 || 6.4 || 2.5
|-
| scope="row" text-align:center | 2018
|
| 22 || 12 || 0 || 1 || 100 || 60 || 160 || 53 || 24 || 0.0 || 0.1 || 8.3 || 5.0 || 13.3 || 4.4 || 2.0
|- style="background-color: #EAEAEA"
| scope="row" style="text-align:center" | 2019
|
| 22 || 13 || 0 || 0 || 119 || 53 || 172 || 65 || 27 || 0.0 || 0.0 || 9.2 || 4.1 || 13.2 || 5.0 || 2.1
|-
|- class="sortbottom"
! colspan=3| Career
! 48
! 0 
! 3 
! 438 
! 206 
! 644 
! 242 
! 102 
! 0.0
! 0.1
! 9.1 
! 4.3 
! 13.4 
! 5.0 
! 2.1 
|}

References

External links

1996 births
Living people
Greater Western Sydney Giants players
Murray Bushrangers players
Australian rules footballers from Victoria (Australia)
Carlton Football Club players